Sophie Mackay (born 22 April 1985) is an Australian professional racing cyclist who rides for Hagens Berman–Supermint.

See also
 List of 2016 UCI Women's Teams and riders

References

External links
 

1985 births
Living people
Australian female cyclists
Place of birth missing (living people)